Saraktashsky District is an administrative and municipal district (raion), one of the thirty-five in Orenburg Oblast, Russia. It is located in the northeast of the oblast. Its administrative center is the rural locality (a settlement) of Saraktash. Population: 40,145 (2010 Census);  The population of Saraktash accounts for 42.9% of the total district's population.

References

Notes

Sources

Districts of Orenburg Oblast